Deh Gah (also Romanized as Deh Gāh; also known as Dehgā) is a village in Dehram Rural District, Dehram District, Farashband County, Fars Province, Iran. At the 2006 census, its population was 187, in 41 families.

References 

Populated places in Farashband County